The American Music Award for Favorite Song – Soul/R&B (formerly known as Favorite Soul/R&B Single 1974-1995) has been awarded since 1974. While the start and end dates for the usage of the category Favorite Black Single are unclear, in 1985 the name was used for the award Prince was given for his single When Doves Cry. The category was retired for over a decade in 1995, before returning in the 2016 ceremony. Years reflect the year in which the awards were presented, for works released in the previous year (until 2003 onward when awards were handed out on November of the same year). The all-time winners for this category are Michael Jackson and Bruno Mars, both with 3 wins. The former is also the most nominated artist.

Winners and nominees

1970s

1980s

1990s

2010s

2020s

Category facts

Multiple wins

 3 wins
 Michael Jackson
 Bruno Mars

 2 wins
 Whitney Houston
 Janet Jackson
 Lionel Richie
 Diana Ross

Multiple nominations

 4 nominations
 Michael Jackson
 Bruno Mars

 3 nominations
 Drake
 Janet Jackson
 Khalid
 2 nominations
 Boyz II Men
 Chris Brown
 Color Me Badd
 Commodores
 Ella Mai
 Gladys Knight & the Pips
 Whitney Houston
 Freddie Jackson
 Rick James
 Anderson .Paak
 Prince
 Lionel Richie
 Diana Ross
 The Weeknd

References

American Music Awards
Rhythm and blues
Song awards
Awards established in 1974
1974 establishments in the United States
Awards established in 2016
Awards disestablished in 1995